The Directorate general for Maritime affairs, Fisheries and Aquaculture (DGAMPA) (La direction générale des affaires maritimes, de la pêche et de l'aguaculture) is a French executive agency created in 2022. It comes under the authority of the State Secretariat for the Sea and the Ministry of Agriculture and Food Sovereignty. The DGAMPA merges the two main directorates dealing with the maritime sector at the central level of the government, namely the Directorate of maritime affairs (DAM) and the Directorate of maritime fisheries and aquaculture (DPMA), but also the staff of the captaincies of the state ports. Éric Banel was appointed first Director General of Maritime Affairs, Fisheries and Aquaculture by the Council of Ministers.

Mission
The creation of the DGAMPA aims to consolidate the means allocated to the sea and to improve the visibility of maritime issues within the government. The goal of the new organization is to meet the challenges of maritime planning and the sustainable development of the blue economy, but also to support the ecological and energy transition of maritime activities, promote knowledge of the marine environment and encourage innovation. The purpose of this new agency is to make it possible to better support changes in maritime transport, fishing and aquaculture as well as the shipbuilding industry. The objective is also to improve the development of data and maritime services, consolidate surveillance capacities, increase the efficacy of rescue and control at sea and, more generally, to support territorial projects, promote maritime employment and more effectively defend the French maritime interests domestically and internationally.

Organization
Leadership 
 Director General: Éric Banel, General Administrator of Maritime Affairs
 Assistant Director General: Noémie Le Quellenec, Chief Engineer of Bridges, Water and Forests
 Director of the project implementation and follow-up of the French Presidency of the Council of the European Union: Matthias Bigorgne, Chief Maritime Affairs Administrator
Organizational elements 
 Cabinet
 Services and human resources
 Budget and acquisition
 Superior Council of Seafarers (secretariat)
 Sustainable Marine Fisheries and Aquaculture Service
 Fleet and Marine Service
 Maritime and Coastal Areas Service
 Information System Sub-Directorate
 National School of Maritime Safety and Administration (ENSAM)

Personnel
The 300 employees of the central organization of DGAMPA are mainly located at the Séquoia tower in La Défense, but they are also present in Saint-Malo (information systems and pleasure tax desk), Marseille (one-stop shop for the French international register), Nantes (office of maritime examinations), Brest (maritime pollution national center of expertise), Le Havre (ENSAM), Quimper (maintenance of lighthouses and beacons), Toulouse and Gris-Nez (search and rescue at sea).

The 2,800 employees in charge of maritime activities in the decentralized services will have a unified management at the central level, whether they serve in the interregional directorates for the sea, the sea and coast delegations of the departments of France, or overseas. The DGAMPA will also oversee Ifremer, FranceAgriMer, the National Establishment for Marine Invalids (ENIM), the French Maritime Academy (ENSM) and vocational maritime schools. The DGAMPA will in addition have authority over the National School for Maritime Security and Administration (ENSAM).

References

Government agencies of France
Law enforcement agencies of France
France